Tristrophis is a genus of moths in the family Geometridae.

Species
Tristrophis cupido Oberthur, 1923
Tristrophis rectifascia (Wileman, 1912)
Tristrophis siaolouaria (Oberthur, 1911)
Tristrophis veneris (Butler, 1878)

References
Natural History Museum Lepidoptera genus database

Ourapterygini